Augustine of Alfeld (1480 – c. 1535) was a teacher and Minister Provincial of the Franciscan Order in Saxony, who was opposed to Martin Luther on the question of papal authority.

Life

He was born in Alfeld, near Hildesheim, and was a professor of Scripture at Leipzig in 1520. There he wrote the pamphlet against Martin Luther Super apostolica sede.

Adolf of Anhalt, the Bishop of Merseburg, in 1520 called on him to dispute the Lutherans preachers. On 20 January 1521 he presided at the public theological disputation held at Weimar, between Johann Lange, Aegidius Mechler, and the Franciscans, on the merit of monastic vows and life; it called forth a satirical poem at the time. In 1523 he became Guardian of the friary at Halle.

Augustine served as a guardian for noble minors in 1524; and was the Minister Provincial for the Franciscan order in Saxony (1529-1532). He died before 1535.

See also

Notes

Attribution

1480 births
1530s deaths
Clergy from Lower Saxony
German Friars Minor
16th-century German Roman Catholic priests
Roman Catholic biblical scholars
Provincial superiors
People from Hildesheim (district)